Head On is the fifth studio album by Canadian rock band Bachman–Turner Overdrive, released in December 1975. On the original vinyl release, the outer album cover expanded into a 24x24 inch poster featuring all four members of the band at that time. It was re-released in 2003 on Repertoire Records in conjunction with Mercury Records. The re-release featured the bonus track "Down to the Line", which was released as a single in 1975 but not included on the vinyl nor the original Mercury CD release of Head On.

Head On was the last non-compilation BTO album to reach the Top 40 on the US Billboard 200, hitting the #23 position on March 6, 1976. It was a top five album in Canada, hitting the #3 position on February 21, 1976.

The single "Take It Like a Man" reached #33 on the US Billboard Hot 100 charts and received significant airplay at that time. It was the last of the band's six U.S Top 40 singles. Pioneering rocker Little Richard played piano on the recording. Near the end of the song, C.F. Turner tells him to "play it Richard", and he does, with heavy expression. Another single from this album, the jazzy "Lookin' Out for #1", did not crack the Top 40 on the U.S. pop charts, but reached #15 on the Adult Contemporary chart, receiving heavy airplay upon its release on both conventional rock and soft rock stations.

"Away from Home" was also released as a single in the UK only, with "Down To The Line" on the B-side. It did not chart.

Track listing

(*) Available only on the 2003 rerelease on CD and the 2013 Japanese Mini LP Remastered CD (as non-album single of 1975)

The Randy Bachman-penned "West Coast Turnaround" was recorded during the Head On sessions but was not released until 2013, when it appeared as a bonus track on the Bachman-Turner Overdrive 40th Anniversary album.

Personnel
Randy Bachman - vocals, guitar
Blair Thornton - guitar
C.F. Turner - vocals, bass guitar
Robbie Bachman - drums, percussion, backing vocals on "Down to the Line"

Additional musicians
Little Richard - piano (6, 9)
Barry Keane - congas

Production
Producer: Randy Bachman
Engineer: Mark Smith

Charts

Certifications

References

Bachman–Turner Overdrive albums
1975 albums
Mercury Records albums